New Mexico Highlands University (NMHU) is a public university in Las Vegas, New Mexico. Founded in 1893, it has satellite campuses in Santa Fe, Albuquerque, Rio Rancho, Farmington and Roswell. NMHU has an average annual enrollment of approximately 3,000 students and offers a variety of undergraduate and graduate degree programs across six schools and colleges, as well as online.

History

NMHU was first established as New Mexico Normal School in 1893, with prominent archaeologist Edgar Lee Hewett serving as its first president. The institution became New Mexico Normal University in 1902, and primarily offered teacher education; it adopted its current name of New Mexico Highlands University in 1941, as it expanded its programs beyond teaching. NMHU now offers graduate and undergraduate programs in arts and sciences, business, education, nursing, and social work.

Located in Las Vegas, a city with a population of over 13,000, Highlands' main campus is close to recreational and wilderness areas and is within an hour's drive of Santa Fe and two hours from Albuquerque.

The majority of NMHU's approximately 3,765 students are from New Mexico and Latino; the university is recognized as a Hispanic Serving Institution by the U.S. Department of Education, which denotes a total undergraduate enrollment that is one-quarter or more Hispanic. Highlands' programs explicitly focus on its multiethnic student body, especially the Latino and American Indian cultures distinctive of New Mexico.

Accreditation
NMHU is accredited by the Higher Learning Commission and also has specialty accreditations for many programs. The School of Education received full accreditation by the National Council for Accreditation of Teacher Education (NCATE) in 2012. The School of Business is accredited by the Association of Collegiate Business Schools and Programs (ACBSP). The School of Social Work is accredited by the Council on Social Work Education (CSWE). The School of Social and Behavioral Sciences is accredited by the Master's in Psychology and Counseling Accreditation Council (MPCAC). The Department of Forestry is accredited by the Society of American Foresters (SAF).

Academics 
NMHU has several bachelor's and master's degree programs spanning six schools and colleges; these include business administration, counseling, nursing, social work, and the natural sciences.

According to U.S. News & World Report, NMHU is one of the top 100 schools for economically disadvantaged students and ranks among the top 45-59 public schools nationwide; it is among the top 12 percent of schools in the 2022 Social Mobility Index, which measures the extent to which institutions provide opportunities for students with family incomes below the national median, based on metrics such as tuition cost, indebtedness among graduates, and post-graduate employment.

Athletics

NMHU's athletic teams are nicknamed the Cowboys / Cowgirls and compete in the NCAA's Division II's Rocky Mountain Athletic Conference. Ten varsity athletics programs are offered, including women's soccer, cross-country, track, volleyball, men's and women's basketball, wrestling, baseball, Softball and college football.

Statewide centers

In the 1997–98 academic year, New Mexico Highlands University established an extended learning center in Rio Rancho and began offering upper-division undergraduate and graduate courses in business, accounting, education, and social work. The center has since added studies in criminal justice, public affairs administration, computer science and general and school counseling. NMHU also has centers in Albuquerque, Santa Fe, and Farmington.

Notable alumni 
 David James Baker, filmmaker and media producer
 Mary Camille Skora Bohannon, radio news anchor/reporter 
 Mark Cotney, professional football player
 Charlie Cowan, professional football player
 Bill Dinwiddie, professional basketball player
 Carl Garrett, professional football player
 Len Garrett, professional football player
 Reggie Garrett, professional football player
 María Dolores Gonzáles, leader of bilingual education in New Mexico
 Eddie Guerrero (1967–2005), professional wrestler
 Keith Jardine, football player; retired mixed martial artist, formerly for the Ultimate Fighting Championship, Strikeforce, and King of the Cage
 Leroy Lamis, sculptor
 Ben Ray Lujan, U.S. Senator from New Mexico (2021–present), former U.S. Representative from New Mexico (2009-2021)
 Ray Leger, educator and member of the New Mexico Senate
 Laura Montoya, New Mexico State Treasurer
 Chris Newsome, professional basketball player
 Frank Olmstead, mayor of Las Vegas, New Mexico and 18th Auditor of New Mexico
 Lionel Taylor, professional football player
 Patsy Trujillo, member of the New Mexico House of Representatives
 Sam Williams, professional football player
 Don Woods, professional football player

References

External links
 
 New Mexico Highlands Athletics website

 
Buildings and structures in San Miguel County, New Mexico
Education in San Miguel County, New Mexico
Educational institutions established in 1893
1893 establishments in New Mexico Territory
Las Vegas, New Mexico
Public universities and colleges in New Mexico